Union of Postal and Telecommunications Workers (GPF) is a trade union representing communication workers in Austria.

The union was founded in 1945 by the Austrian Trade Union Federation.  By 1998, it had 78,436 members.  Historically, almost all the union's members worked for Post und Telekom Austria, but following privatisation and the entry of competitors into the market, it now has members in a variety of companies.

References
1945: Alois Jakl
1950s: Karl Schrober
1964: Josef Schweiger
1977: Norbert Tmej

2011: Helmut Köstinger

External links

References

Trade unions in Austria
Trade unions established in 1945
Communications trade unions
1945 establishments in Austria